James Espey (born 23 January 1984 in Bangor) is an Irish sailor. He competed at the 2012 Summer Olympics in the Men's Laser class.

References

1984 births
Living people
Irish male sailors (sport)
Olympic sailors of Ireland
Sailors at the 2012 Summer Olympics – Laser